Mianrud is a city in Khuzestan Province, Iran.

Mianrud or Mian Rud or Miyan Rud may refer to:

Ardabil Province
 Mianrud, Ardabil, a village in Khalkhal County

Fars Province
Mian Rud, Eqlid, a village in Eqlid County
Mianrud, Marvdasht, a village in Marvdasht County

Gilan Province
 Mian Rud, Rezvanshahr, a village in Rezvanshahr County
 Mianrud, Pareh Sar, a village in Rezvanshahr County
 Mianrud, Rudsar, a village in Rudsar County

Hamadan Province
 Miyan Rud Rural District, in Hamadan Province

Kermanshah Province
 Mian Rud, Gilan-e Gharb, a village in Gilan-e Gharb County
 Mianrud, Govar, a village in Gilan-e Gharb County
 Mianrud, Kermanshah, a village in Kermanshah County
 Mianrud, Firuzabad, a village in Kermanshah County

Khuzestan Province
 Mianrud

Lorestan Province
 Mian Rud-e Zaruni, Lorestan Province

Markazi Province
 Mian Rud, Markazi
 Mian Rud, alternate name of Mian Rudan, Markazi

Mazandaran Province
 Mian Rud, Bala Khiyaban-e Litkuh, a village in Amol County
 Mian Rud, Harazpey-ye Jonubi, a village in Amol County
 Mian Rud, Dabudasht, a village in Amol County
 Mian Rud, Babol, a village in Babol County
 Mian Rud, Qaem Shahr, a village in Qaem Shahr County
 Mian Rud, Sari, a village in Sari County
 Mian Rud, Tonekabon, a village in Tonekabon County
 Mianrud Rural District, in Nur County

South Khorasan Province
 Mian Rud, South Khorasan
 Mian Rud, Nehbandan, South Khorasan Province